This is a list of the Monitor Latino number-one songs of 2012. Chart rankings are based on airplay across radio states in Mexico utilizing the Radio Tracking Data, LLC in real time. Charts are ranked from Monday to Sunday. Besides the General chart, Monitor Latino published "Pop", "Regional Mexican" and "Anglo" charts.

Chart history

General

Pop

Regional

English

See also
List of Top 20 songs for 2012 in Mexico
List of number-one albums of 2012 (Mexico)

References

2012
Number-one songs
Mexico